A Meierhof or Meyerhof (from ) was a farm or building which was occupied or had been occupied by the administrator (the Meier) of a noble or ecclesiastical estate.

Large landlords, especially kings and churches, had extensive networks of associated farms with a central administration. This central administration was the seat of the landlord or his local manager, the Meier (akin to a bailiff or factor). The importance and size ranged from barely better than any other local farm to a big business with a number of unfree vassal farms, a manor house, several outbuildings and fenced paddocks.  Often the Meierhof included a chapel or church for the noble.  Directly owned by the Meierhof was the so-called Salland or personal land.  The Salland generally consisted arable land, but could also include pastures, forests, special crops such as vineyards and orchards, or special facilities such as mills and fish ponds.  The Meierhof also had a number of dependent peasants who were obliged to pay taxes and provide forced labor on the farm.

While the building might be leased to another tenant later, the name often remained with the building.  Especially in northern Germany today, many of these buildings are still known as Meierhof.

The similar Sedelhof was a tax-exempt farm building owned by a noble that was unfortified.

See also
Meier a common surname in German-speaking countries

References

External links
 
 Herrschaftliche Eigenhöfe im Spätmittelalter
 Fronhöfe

Medieval Germany